Lucas Zellmer (born 3 December 1977 in Berlin) is a German former yacht racer who competed in the 2004 Summer Olympics.

References

External links
 

1977 births
Living people
German male sailors (sport)
Olympic sailors of Germany
Sailors at the 2004 Summer Olympics – 470
Sportspeople from Berlin
21st-century German people